Oughterard railway station was on the Midland Great Western Railway (MGWR) Galway to Clifden railway.

History
The 9:25am return left Oughterard with a mere seven passengers, part of the reason being New Year's Day was a strict Church holyday. 

The station proved useful in bringing tourists and anglers to the Ouhterard area. 

The station closed with the line in 1935.

References

Footnotes

Sources

Further reading
 

Disused railway stations in County Galway
Railway stations opened in 1895
Railway stations closed in 1935